Edward Proctor (1870–1944) was an English footballer who played in the Football League for Stoke.

Career
Proctor played for Leek and Royal Dublin Fusiliers before joining league club Stoke in 1895. He played three times for Stoke in 1895–96 scoring twice against The Wednesday and Preston North End. He then moved onto Midland Football League club and nearby rivals Burslem Port Vale in October 1896. He scored on his debut, in a 1–1 draw with Dresden United at the Athletic Ground in a Staffordshire Senior Cup preliminary round match on 10 October 1896. He was a first team regular until he lost his place in January 1897 and was most likely released at the end of the season.

Career statistics
Source:

References

1870 births
1944 deaths
Association football forwards
Royal Dublin Fusiliers soldiers
English footballers
Stoke City F.C. players
Port Vale F.C. players
English Football League players
Midland Football League players
19th-century British Army personnel